Goud is a caste consisting predominantly of indigenous people in the Indian states of Telangana and Andhra Pradesh. They belong to Koundinya rishi gotra. They are traditionally involved in toddy tapping. However, they are also involved in many modern occupations.

The Gouds are rapidly developing. However, Goud women lag behind in development.

References

Lists of people by surname
Telugu society
Social groups of Telangana
Social groups of Andhra Pradesh
Indian castes